"O"-Jung.Ban.Hap. (stylized as "O"-正.反.合.), sometimes referred to as "O"-Union or just O, is the third Korean studio album (fourth overall) by South Korean boy group TVXQ, released through SM Entertainment on September 29, 2006. In a year when Korean music sales had slumped, it was the highest selling album in South Korea in 2006 and won the group several prominent awards in South Korea. The album stayed charted within the top 50 throughout 2007. By 2014, it sold over 475,000 copies.

The album's name "O"-Jung.Ban.Hap, literally translated to "O"-Justice.Opposition.Solution, is based on Georg Wilhelm Friedrich Hegel's theory of thesis, antithesis, synthesis. The album's lead single of the same name has lyrics that regard global conflicts with a plea for peace and resistance. The album has a balance of fast tempo songs and ballads.

Versions and repackaging
The album was released in 4 different versions and packaging, versions A and B, C and D. Versions A and B promote the title song """O"-正.反.合.", while versions C and D promote the fantasy theme of the song "Balloons" and contain new songs and a DVD in each. The initial versions of the album with the original track listing was released in CD and cassette formats.

For the version D, the label company did a unique box packaging, with special deck of cards with members' pictures wearing costumes included with the CD and DVD specials.

In Hong Kong and Taiwan, the album was released under the names "O"-Jing.Fan.Hap. and "O"-Zheng.Fan.He. respectively, while in Japan the name of the album is "O"-Sei.Han.Go.. The Japanese release does not contain the repackaged versions that are available in the Korean release.

Singles

"O"-Jung.Ban.Hap
The lead single is a fast-tempo fusion of rock, hip hop, and electronic trance. The music video took several days to complete as its footage was shot in several different countries. U-Know Yunho's footage was shot in Japan, Micky Yoochun's and Max Changmin's in Prague, Hero Jaejoong's in Thailand, and Xiah Junsu's in South Korea. The music video showcases intense and unique dance choreography with stylized outfits.

Balloons
In drastic contrast to the lead single, "Balloons" (Pungseon in Korean) is a bubbly song that features TVXQ members in animal costumes, made to directly appeal to the younger generation, as well as older generations familiar with the original "Balloons" by Five Fingers (an old Korean band). The lyrics talk about innocent childhood dreams and memories and how people tend to forget the importance of those dreams as they grow older. In the lyrics, "yellow balloons" line was changed to "red balloons" to coordinate with the colour that represents TVXQ's fanbase Cassiopeia. The music video also included younger versions of several group's notable members, including ASTRO's Moon Bin, iKON's Chanwoo and SF9's Chani.

Performances
In three short months after the album's release, TVXQ were invited to perform on many stages of music shows, award shows, and concerts. TVXQ performed their third album's songs a few times in 2007 as well, since a fourth Korean album had not been released.

Accolades

Track listing 

Notes
 "White Lie" is track number 6 on versions C & D and the Japanese version, so all subsequent songs are pushed by one.
 The Japanese version does not include songs "You Only Love" and "Balloons".

Charts

Weekly charts

Monthly charts

Year-end charts

Sales

Release history

References

2006 albums
TVXQ albums
Grand Prize Golden Disc Award-winning albums
SM Entertainment albums
Korean-language albums
Albums produced by Lee Soo-man